Obelisk Square can refer to the following public squares:
Place de l'Obélisque, a central plaza in Dakar, Senegal
Obelisk Square (Indianapolis), formally known as the Veterans Memorial Plaza, part of the Indiana World War Memorial Plaza in Indianapolis, Indiana, United States